The United States Court of Customs and Patent Appeals  (CCPA) was a United States federal court which existed from 1909 to 1982 and had jurisdiction over certain types of civil disputes.

History
The CCPA began as the United States Court of Customs Appeals, created by the Payne–Aldrich Tariff Act of August 5, 1909, and it started its work the following year, on April 22, 1910. Five judges for the new court were appointed by President Taft: Robert Morris Montgomery, William H. Hunt, James Francis Smith, Orion M. Barber and Marion De Vries. The jurisdiction was originally appeals from decisions of the Board of General Appraisers, and no further appellate review was permitted. This changed in 1914, when writ of certiorari by the United States Supreme Court was allowed.  The Patent Act of 1922 enlarged the jurisdiction of the court to include appeals on questions of law from Tariff Commission findings in proceedings relating to unfair practices in the import trade.

In 1929 the court's name was changed to the United States Court of Customs and Patent Appeals by an enactment that conferred upon it appeals from the United States Patent Office. These appeals included ex parte patent cases, appeals from interference proceedings, and trademark cases, appeals which theretofore had been heard in United States Court of Appeals for the District of Columbia Circuit. In the 1929 case Ex Parte Bakelite Corporation, the Supreme Court held that the CCPA was a court formed under Article I of the Constitution. This left the judges unable to sit by designation on regular federal courts, and in an ambiguous situation regarding judicial retirement. This situation was not addressed by Congress until August 25, 1958, when a law was passed deeming the CCPA an Article III court. This law was subsequently upheld by the Supreme Court, which overruled the Bakelite case. 

In 1930 the CCPA moved into the Internal Revenue Service Building and remained there until 1967. The CCPA moved into the National Courts Building (now the Howard T. Markey National Courts Building), which it shared with the United States Court of Claims.

In 1982 the CCPA was abolished by the Federal Courts Improvement Act, and its jurisdiction, docket, and judges were transferred to the United States Court of Appeals for the Federal Circuit.

Judges
A total of 25 judges were appointed to the CCPA over the life of the court:

Succession of seats

See also
United States Court of International Trade
United States Court of Appeals for the Federal Circuit

Bibliography 
A brief history of the United States Court of Customs and Patent Appeals / by Giles S. Rich. Washington, D.C. : Published by authorization of Committee on the Bicentennial of Independence and the Constitution of the Judicial Conference of the United States : U.S. G.P.O., 1980.

References

External links
 History of the court from the Federal Judicial Center
 Biographies of the judges from the Federal Judicial Center

Defunct United States courts
United States patent law
Article I tribunals
United States trade law
1909 establishments in the United States
1982 disestablishments in the United States
Courts and tribunals established in 1909
Courts and tribunals disestablished in 1982